Anatoly Timoshenko (born 11 September 1956) is a Soviet equestrian. He competed at the 1988 Summer Olympics and the 1992 Summer Olympics.

References

External links
 
 

1956 births
Living people
Soviet male equestrians
Olympic equestrians of the Soviet Union
Olympic equestrians of the Unified Team
Equestrians at the 1988 Summer Olympics
Equestrians at the 1992 Summer Olympics
Place of birth missing (living people)